Charles C. Adams Jr. (born August 25, 1947) is the former United States Ambassador to Finland.

Previously, he was an American international arbitration expert<ref>{{cite web |url=http://www.akingump.com/files/Publication/d8bbb9a1-a6d3-4bd9-b446-a262b2de7836/Presentation/PublicationAttachment/74925ff3-f45d-4eb7-bbe5-a2ef2b2e413e/13_3_12_The_state_of_arbitration.pdf |title=The State of Arbitration, Global Arbitration Review, March 13, 2012 |date= |access-date=2012-10-26 }}</ref> and American political and social activist. Based in Geneva, Switzerland, he served as co-chair of Americans Abroad for Obama, a Democratic Party fundraising and networking organization of Americans living overseas. and raised money for Democratic candidate Pete Buttigieg.

He also served as a member of the National Finance Committee of the 2012 Barack Obama presidential campaign, a position he also held during the 2008 Obama campaign.

He was nominated Ambassador to Finland by President Barack Obama in July 2014 and was confirmed by the U.S. Senate on June 24, 2015. He presented his credentials on December 8, 2015, and served until January 20, 2017.

Early life
Adams was born in Belfast, Northern Ireland, one of six children of Charles C. Adams, a career diplomat with the U.S. State Department, and the former Florence Schneider of Brooklyn, New York.  He was raised in the countries of his father's assignments, including Canada, France, Germany, Ghana, Morocco and Senegal, as well as the Washington, D.C. area.

He attended Dartmouth College and received his Bachelor of Arts degree in 1968. From 1968 to 1970, he was a Peace Corps volunteer, serving in Kenya.  Following the Peace Corps, he attended law school at University of Virginia, receiving his J.D. degree in 1973.

Career
Adams began practicing international law in Washington, D.C., and moved to Paris before establishing residence in Geneva in 1986.

Currently, Adams is partner at Orrick, Herrington & Sutcliffe, an international law firm based in the United States. He leads the firm's international arbitration practice, with a focus on high-value disputes, and serves as head of the firm's Geneva office.  His practice includes major infrastructure and construction projects, joint venture agreements, intellectual property, insurance, energy, manufacturing, telecommunications and transportation industries.

He occasionally serves on international arbitration panels, and appears frequently on various news media outlets, commenting on U.S. political issues.

Notable publications include English Supreme Court Upholds Party Autonomy in International Arbitration, which examined a 2011 British high court decision which called into question tenets of impartiality when setting up international arbitration panels.  In 2012, Adams provided historical roots and context to current issues in an article titled The State of Arbitration'', published by a leading international professional journal.  In an article published in early 2013, Adams makes a case that as costs rise, Switzerland is an ideal location to conduct international arbitration. "The domestic courts take a hands-off approach, and the non-intrusion...is certainly a benefit. There is also a well developed infrastructure in place and compared to other centers such as London or Paris it is perhaps surprisingly lower in cost," he said.

In addition to English, he speaks French, German and Swahili.

Boards
He serves as Executive-in-Residence and on the board of advisers of the Taylor Institute, a research and post-graduate study center of Franklin University Switzerland.

He also serves on the board of advisers of End Human Trafficking Now, a human rights group.  He is a past president of the International Center for Humanitarian Reporting, located in Cambridge, Massachusetts.

He is a member of the board of trustees of the Dubai International Arbitration Centre, an initiative of the Dubai Chamber of Commerce and Industry.

He is a frequent guest lecturer at the International Development Law Organization, the University of Geneva and other institutions of legal education.

He serves as a Member of the Board of Advisors of the Global Panel Foundation, an NGO that works behind the scenes in crisis areas around the world.

References

External links
Akin Gump biography
Charles C. Adams Jr. website
 

1947 births
American social activists
Living people
Peace Corps volunteers
Ambassadors of the United States to Finland
Dartmouth College alumni
University of Virginia School of Law alumni
Lawyers from Belfast
Jones Day people
Orrick, Herrington & Sutcliffe people